Riagail, aka Regulus, Irish monk, fl. 573–600.

Riagail was an Irish monk expelled from Ireland with Columba.

See also

 Riagail of Bangor, died 881.

External links
 http://www.ucc.ie/celt/published/T201040/index.html

6th-century Irish people